Ruslan Vitaliyovych Skydan (born 29 June 2001) is a Ukrainian professional footballer who plays as a right winger.

References

External links
 
 

2001 births
Living people
Footballers from Odesa
Ukrainian footballers
Association football forwards
FC Dynamo Kyiv players
FC Zorya Luhansk players
FC Obolon-Brovar Kyiv players
FC Obolon-2 Kyiv players
Ukrainian First League players
Ukrainian Second League players